Kinugasa (written: 衣笠) is a Japanese surname. Notable people with the surname include:

, Japanese military officer
, Japanese baseball player
, Japanese swimmer
, Japanese actor and film director

Japanese-language surnames